The National Hockey League's North Division (branded as Scotia NHL North Division for sponsorship reasons) was one of the four divisions used by the NHL for the 2020–21 NHL season. This division was organized in 2020 as the result of the travel restrictions that had been in place since March 2020 between the Canada–United States border due to the COVID-19 pandemic. The entirety of the 2020–21 regular season and first two rounds of the playoffs were played between these seven teams.

Of the four divisions in 2020–21, the North Division was the only one with a name not previously used by the NHL. It was also the first all-Canadian NHL division to play since the league first expanded into the United States in 1924.

Division lineups

2020–21
 Calgary Flames
 Edmonton Oilers
 Montreal Canadiens
 Ottawa Senators
 Toronto Maple Leafs
 Vancouver Canucks
 Winnipeg Jets

Changes from the 2019–20 season
 The North Division is formed due to COVID-19 restrictions
 The Calgary Flames, Edmonton Oilers and Vancouver Canucks come from the Pacific Division
 The Montreal Canadiens, Ottawa Senators and Toronto Maple Leafs come from the Atlantic Division
 The Winnipeg Jets come from the Central Division

Changes from the 2020–21 season
 The division is dissolved as the league returned to previous two conference and four division alignment
 The Calgary Flames, Edmonton Oilers and Vancouver Canucks return to the Pacific Division
 The Montreal Canadiens, Ottawa Senators and Toronto Maple Leafs return to the Atlantic Division
 The Winnipeg Jets return to the Central Division

Division champions
 2021 – Toronto Maple Leafs (35–14–7, 77 pts)

Season results

References

External links
 NHL History

National Hockey League divisions
2020–21 NHL season
2020–21 in Canadian ice hockey
2021 in Canadian sports
2021 in ice hockey
2020 establishments in Canada
Sports leagues established in 2020
COVID-19 pandemic in Canada